Stephen John "Billy" Hughes (born 29 July 1960) is an English former professional footballer. His clubs included Gillingham, where he made over 100 Football League appearances, Crystal Palace and Wimbledon.

He made his Football League debut for Gillingham aged just 15 years and 259 days, and remained the youngest player to play for the club until 2007 when Luke Freeman made his debut aged 15 years and 233 days.

In 1980, he played one game on loan to the San Jose Earthquakes of the North American Soccer League.

References

1960 births
People from Folkestone
Living people
Association football midfielders
English footballers
Gillingham F.C. players
Maidstone United F.C. (1897) players
Wimbledon F.C. players
Crystal Palace F.C. players
San Jose Earthquakes (1974–1988) players
Durban United F.C. players
Hythe Town F.C. players
English Football League players
North American Soccer League (1968–1984) players
English expatriate sportspeople in the United States
Expatriate soccer players in the United States
English expatriate footballers